The Kentucky Cup Distaff Stakes is an American Thoroughbred horse race run annually at Turfway Park in Florence, Kentucky. The Grade III event is run near the end of the fall meet and is open to fillies and mares aged three and older. Contested on Polytrack synthetic dirt at a distance of one and one-sixteenth miles, the race offered a purse of $100,000 in 2008.

Before 2008, the race was part of the Breeders' Cup Stakes Program and carried $75,000 in additional purse money from the Breeders' Cup Fund.  Until 2007 the race was called the Turfway Breeders' Cup Stakes.

With the support of WinStar Farm, this race which was suspended in 2010 due to economic challenges, will return in 2011.

Records
Speed  record
 1:41.60 - Mariah's Storm (1995)

Most wins
 2 - Fit For A Queen (1991, 1992)
 2 - Trip (2001, 2002)

Most wins by an owner
 2 - Hermitage Farm (1991, 1992)
 2 - Claiborne Farm (2001, 2002)

Most wins by a jockey
 2 - Chris McCarron (1989, 1994)
 2 - Ricardo Lopez (1991, 1992)
 2 - Willie Martinez (1999, 2006)
 2 - Pat Day (2000, 2002)

Most wins by a trainer
 4 - D. Wayne Lukas (1989, 1996, 2000, 2004)
 3 - William I. Mott (1997, 2005, 2009)

Winners of the Kentucky Cup Distaff Stakes

References
 The Kentucky Cup Distaff Stakes at Pedigree Query
 Kentucky Cup Stakes restored by WinStar Farm

Graded stakes races in the United States
Mile category horse races for fillies and mares
Recurring sporting events established in 1986
Turfway Park horse races
1986 establishments in Kentucky